The second season of One Million Star, a Taiwanese televised singing competition, began on July 20, 2007. Similar to the first season, the competition started with 100 participants, and most of the contents and rules remained unchanged. Altogether 28 episodes were aired.

Million Star Gang II
Members of Million Star Gang II (星光二班)

 Yuming Lai
 Rachel Liang
 Uni Yeh (葉瑋庭)
 Quack Wu (吳忠明)
 Annie Lin (林宜融)
 Pets Tseng
 Jane Huang
 Queen Wei (魏如昀)
 Christina Lin (林佩瑤)
 Lee Chien-na

Episodes

Ranking
Below are the ranking and score of the delegates since episode 8, when the top 20 is announced.

Notes:

1. Episodes 24–26 are championships. The marks in these three episodes would be counted in the final, and the delegate with the lowest total mark in these three episodes would be eliminated and became the 6th place of season 2.
The ranking of those three episodes in the chart below is the overall ranking of the championship after that episode/round.

Color Codes：
 Champion
 20 points and above
 Entered into Failure Area
 Eliminated
 Successful resurrection
 Fail resurrection
 Did not participate in that episode therefore skip to the next episode
 Quit

Contestant
Colour key

Period 1

Period 2

Period 3

References

External links
  Official Blog
  "Stars" movie homepage

Taiwanese television series